Kyle Cooper is an American designer known for his main title sequence work. He has produced and directed over 350 visual effects and title sequences for motion pictures and broadcast.

Early life

Childhood 
Cooper was born on a Friday the 13th in Salem, Massachusetts. As a child, Cooper spent his days obsessed with sketching monsters. He was also fascinated by comic books, monster makeup books, and horror movies. Cooper stated in an interview with Revert to Saved that he had always wanted to be a film director, “I’ve always been interested in film and editing—more specifically, the juxtaposition of images in film or on a single page. However, I felt it more comprehensive to tell stories over time. Print design can provide great single moments, but I wanted to work with a sequence that had a beginning, middle and end".

Education 
When it came time for Cooper to go to college, he attended the University of Massachusetts Amherst, studying interior architecture. While on the brink of failing, he convinced his professor to let him pass by making a promise -- that he would never actually work as an interior designer.

Cooper then went on to earn his Master of Fine Arts in graphic design at Yale University in 1988. He studied independently with renowned American modernist Paul Rand during his time there. Cooper wrote his thesis on director Sergei Eisenstein, and was awarded the Mohawk Paper Traveling Fellowship to complete his thesis research in the then Soviet Union.

Career

Early work 
After graduating with his M.F.A. from the Yale School of Art, Cooper went on to work at R/GA (then known as R/Greenberg Associates) from 1988 to 1996, first in New York City and then Los Angeles. During this period, Cooper created the title sequence for the 1995 American crime film Seven (1995 film), a seminal work which received critical acclaim and is credited for inspiring a number of younger designers for years to come. According to Cooper, at the time he made the title sequence for Seven, main title sequences were behind what was happening in print, music videos, and commercials. Cooper has stated he aimed to create main titles that would raise the bar creatively for future title sequences.

Founded companies 
In 1996, Cooper founded Imaginary Forces with Peter Frankfurt and Chip Houghton. Imaginary Forces went on to become one of the most successful creative agencies in Hollywood that came out of the West Coast division of R/GA. “We have spent a long time building and refining a brilliant creative and production team… Keeping this group together as our own company is truly exciting,” commented Cooper about the name change. Too involved by the business side of running a design company the size of Imaginary Forces, Cooper decided it was time for him to focus more on his creative work. In 2003, Cooper left imaginary forces and founded Prologue, a creative agency in which he works in a small team while concentrating on creating title sequences.

Influences 
Cooper has claimed his greatest influence in his choice of profession is Stephen Frankfurt’s opening title sequence for To Kill a Mockingbird (film). Cooper also pulls inspiration from William Shakespeare – his former production company, Imaginary Forces, takes its name from a line in the prologue of  Shakespeare's Henry V (play). The idea to name the company after this prologue is based on the idea that opening titles often act like a prologue to a film. This of course can also be seen as an influence for his current company, “Prologue”. All that said, Wired (magazine) notes Cooper isn’t typically hired due to a signature “style”. He’s hired to "dig under the celluloid and tap into the symbolism of a film". This was a precedent he started with some of his earliest work, notably Seven (1995 film).

Awards and acclaim 
Details magazine credits Cooper with “almost single-handedly revitalizing the main title sequence as an art form”. Los Angeles magazine calls him the “Da Vinci of main titles”. He is “one of the top 50 biggest and best creative thinkers from the last 20 years of advertising and consumer culture,” according to Creativity magazine. Wired magazine states, “Not since Saul Bass’ legendary preludes … have credits attracted such attention”. 

Cooper is a member of the Academy of Motion Picture Arts and Sciences, and holds the title of honorary Royal Designer for Industry from the Royal Society of Arts in London. He has seven Emmy nominations and two wins. In 2014, he was also the recipient of the lifetime achievement medal from the American Institute of Graphic Arts, recognizing him for designing title sequences for film and television with a “bold and unexpected style”.

Selected film, television, and game title sequences

References

External links

Prologue
The Incredible Hulk (+ Kyle Cooper interview) on Art of the Title
Kyle Cooper video interview pt. 1/2 on Forget the Film, Watch the Titles
Kyle Cooper lecture Kyle Cooper lecture at Boston University

American graphic designers
Film and television title designers
Yale School of Art alumni
University of Massachusetts Amherst alumni
AIGA medalists
Artists from Salem, Massachusetts
Living people
Year of birth missing (living people)